Bihta is a town and Block in Patna district, Bihar state, India. Bihta is part of Maner Assembly constituency and Pataliputra Lok Sabha constituency. Bihta is also an upcoming satellite town of Patna.

Geography
It is the strategic location named as greater Patna and many real estate companies are investing in the region. Bihta has a famous old temple named Van Devi at Kanchanpur Bihta, and a Shiv temple: Baba Biteshwar Nath in Gultera Bazar. There is 220/132/33 KV Power Grid substation in Dumri in Bihta, where commercial operation started in April 2019. There is a dry port south of the railway station and an oil depot, both with rail connectivity. This highway will be completed by 2022 and will connect Patna to Bihta Airport via the Danapur railway station and Shivala Chowk. Of its total 20 km length,  would be elevated. The elevated portion will terminate at the junction of the Bihta-Sarmera Road near Kanhauli village. From that junction, the road will go up to the Bihta chowk besides connecting the Bihta Airport; it would again be elevated at the Bihta chowk. There are many hotels and shops.

Educational institutes
IIT Patna's campus is located within the parameters of Amhara and Dilawarpur villages in Bihta block, on a  site. Bihar government had already allotted  of land at Amhara village in Bihta to NIT Patna. There is Kendriya Vidyalaya, Lok Sabha Speaker Meira Kumar laid the foundation stone of an Employees State Insurance Corporation (ESIC) medical college and hospital in Bihta in September 2009. The 500-bed ESIC hospital and college was built here on a  plot here at a cost of 523 crore. The ESIC medical college and hospital was inaugurated on 7 July 2018.

Union minister Kapil Sibal on 3 June 2013 laid the foundation stone of the permanent campus of National Institute of Electronics & Information Technology (NIELIT) at Bihta.

International Airport

As air traffic grows and short runway issues arise at Patna airport, also known as the Lok Nayak Jayaprakash Airport, the central government has considered moving the facility outside Bihar's capital city to Bihta. According to senior government officials, negotiations are underway between the ministry of civil aviation and the air force to shift the airport from Patna to Bihta, which is a defence airfield 20 km away from the existing facility.

Bihta has one airforce base station. Airports Authority of India has planned to develop Bihta airport for international operations. Boeing 747 require 12,000 feet of long runways to land.

In October 2016, Bihar cabinet approved the Patna master plan 2031 which envisions development of a new airport at Bihta. Bihar government is acquiring  of land for construction of the new airport. Bihar cabinet approved a budget of ₹260 crore for the acquisition of 126 acres for Bihta airport which will be completed by October 2019. An elevated expressway from Saguna Mor to Bihta is going to be constructed. Of the 126 acres of acquired land for Bihta airport,  will be utilised for development of a civil enclave and the remaining 18 acres for development of amenities, including a VIP lounge, a hotel and a hangar.

An  four-lane semi-elevated road between the proposed Bihta airbase and Danapur railway station is being constructed at the expenditure of  1400 crore. National Highways Authority of India (NHAI) will construct 13.5 km elevated four-lane road from Bihta to Shivala, while the remaining 5 km stretch from Shivala to Danapur station will be constructed by Bihar RCD. Apart from Danapur-Shivala-Bihta road, Bihta will be connected by two more four-lane roads: Patna-Buxar NH-30 and Bihta-Sarmera SH-78.

Real estate boom

The price of land in Bihta — 40 km west of Patna — has skyrocketed in the past few years in large part due to the construction of a number of projects in the area, including the Indian Institute of Technology (IIT), National Institute of Technology (NIT), Employees' State Insurance Corporation (ESIC) Hospital, and others. At present, a cottah of land is priced between  30 and  35 lakh in urban areas. Even in nearby villages like Amhara, Kanchanpur, and Dilawarpur the price of 1 cottah of land is ₹ 15-20 Lakh. A few years ago, such land was available for 2-2.5 lakh in urban and ₹ 25k-50k in rural areas. 25 acres of land have been acquired at Bihta in Patna district for setting up the State Disaster Response Force (SDRF) headquarters and training centre.

Real estate also acquired land near the village of Paharpur to build a colony for families of retired paramilitary forces. Majorly Suraksha enclave members are acquiring land for the development of a residential, logistic and industrial park (LIP), which is fully functional at Bihta at the site of a former sugar mill. Work is in progress by a team led by officials of the IT department. Construction work will begin by mid-2013. It is also popular for Swami Sahajanand Saraswati ashram. Highway Residency By Satyamev Group A RERA Approved Township project is one of them.

IT Park

The Bihar government has acquired 25 acres of land for an IT park. In October 2018, Bihar’s government approved Rs 38 crore for the acquisition of 33 acres of land for IT Park at Bihta as part of a Mega Industrial Park. IT giants, including Infosys, have shown interest for a plot near Bihta. Tata Consultancy Services (TCS) has already been assigned with the responsibility of developing a main data centre which will provide IT links to all government departments. The IT centre was formally launched in March 2013 on the premises of Beltron Bhawan. A regional centre of the National Institute of Electronics & Information Technology (NIELIT) will also be developed at Bihta. The land for the IT park has already been selected and bidding processes for selection of a consultancy company for promotion of the IT park has almost been completed. NEECH Technology of Kolkata is engaged in collecting data for social and caste censuses in Bihar, and HP Education Services is engaged in providing IT skill development courses.

Economy
A $35 million production facility for Cobra Beer, a premium beer brand promoted by Lord Karan Bilimoria, was set up at Bihta in 2010. Not the closed sugar mill is going to be revived. Hero Cycles Ltd, part of the O.P. Munjal Group, started production at Amhara village near IIT Patna in Bihta from June 2014 to cater to different markets.

List of villages
The list of villages in Bihta Block (under Danapur Tehsil) is as follows:
 Amhara
 Anandpur
 Bela
 Bihta
 Bindaul
 Bishunpura
 Dayalpur Daulatpur
 Daulatpur Simri
 Kanchanpur Kharagpur
 Kateshar
 Kouriya
 Kunwa
 Machhalpur Lai
 Makhdumpur
 Mushepur
 Neora
 Painal
 Parev
 Purusottampur Painathi
 Raghopur
 Sadisopur 
 Sikandarpur
 Sri Chandpur
 Sri Rampur
 Tara Nagar
 Yamunapur

See also
 1997 Raghopur Massacre
 Bihta railway station
 Bihta Air Force Station
 Patna Regional Development Authority
 Sonepur

References

Cities and towns in Patna district
Neighbourhoods in Patna